Hystrichopus is a genus of inconspicuous, nocturnal beetles in the family Carabidae. The genus is native to the greater part of the Afrotropics and locally to the southern Palaearctic.

Species
The species include:

Hystrichopus aethiopicus Alluaud, 1922
Hystrichopus agilis Peringuey, 1892
Hystrichopus alticola Alluaud, 1908
Hystrichopus altitudinis Peringuey, 1899
Hystrichopus angolensis Basilewsky, 1942
Hystrichopus angusticollis Boheman, 1848
Hystrichopus arnoldi Basilewsky, 1954
Hystrichopus atratus (Chaudoir, 1850)
Hystrichopus badius (Wiedemann, 1821)
Hystrichopus bambutensis Basilewsky, 1984
Hystrichopus brincki Basilewsky, 1958
Hystrichopus brittoni Basilewsky, 1954
Hystrichopus brunneus Basilewsky, 1954
Hystrichopus colasi Basilewsky, 1954
Hystrichopus cordicollis Basilewsky, 1954
Hystrichopus cribripennis Basilewsky, 1954
Hystrichopus culminicola Basilewsky, 1954
Hystrichopus drago Basilewsky, 1984
Hystrichopus elegans Raffray, 1885
Hystrichopus femoralis Boheman, 1848
Hystrichopus freyi Basilewsky, 1954
Hystrichopus gracilis Peringuey, 1896
Hystrichopus hanangiensis Basilewsky, 1962
Hystrichopus hecqi Basilewsky, 1954
Hystrichopus hessei Basilewsky, 1954
Hystrichopus jacoti Basilewsky, 1954
Hystrichopus jocquei Basilewsky, 1984
Hystrichopus kaboboanus Basilewsky, 1960
Hystrichopus kahuzicus Basilewsky, 1954
Hystrichopus kalaharicus Basilewsky, 1984
Hystrichopus kilimanus Basilewsky, 1962
Hystrichopus kochi Basilewsky, 1984
Hystrichopus laticollis Basilewsky, 1954
Hystrichopus laurenti Basilewsky, 1954
Hystrichopus leleupi Basilewsky, 1954
Hystrichopus leleupianus Basilewsky, 1961
Hystrichopus lubukae Basilewsky, 1954
Hystrichopus marakwetianus Basilewsky, 1948
Hystrichopus marlieri Basilewsky, 1954
Hystrichopus massaicus Basilewsky, 1948
Hystrichopus mateui Basilewsky, 1984
Hystrichopus meruensis Alluaud, 1908
Hystrichopus mirei Basilewsky, 1984
Hystrichopus mniszechi Peringuey, 1896
Hystrichopus natalensis Basilewsky, 1984
Hystrichopus nigerrimus Basilewsky, 1961
Hystrichopus nimbanus Basilewsky, 1951
Hystrichopus nyassicus Basilewsky, 1984
Hystrichopus olbrechtsi Basilewsky, 1954
Hystrichopus platyderus Basilewsky, 1954
Hystrichopus plesius Basilewsky, 1948
Hystrichopus praedator Peringuey, 1896
Hystrichopus pusillus Basilewsky, 1954
Hystrichopus recticollis Peringuey, 1896
Hystrichopus ruandanus Basilewsky, 1954
Hystrichopus rufipennis (Dejean, 1831)
Hystrichopus rufipes (Dejean, 1828)
Hystrichopus rufofemoralis Basilewsky, 1984
Hystrichopus rugicollis Basilewsky, 1961
Hystrichopus seynaevei Basilewsky, 1954
Hystrichopus similis Peringuey, 1896
Hystrichopus subtenuicollis Basilewsky, 1984
Hystrichopus sulcatus (Dejean, 1828)
Hystrichopus tenuicollis Peringuey, 1896
Hystrichopus uluguruanus Basilewsky, 1962
Hystrichopus upembanus Basilewsky, 1984
Hystrichopus uyttenboogaarti Basilewsky, 1948
Hystrichopus velox Peringuey, 1904
Hystrichopus vigilans (Sturm, 1824)

References

External links
 
 Subtribe: Cymindidina at Wikispecies

Lebiinae